Frederick Jerome Beasley (born September 18, 1974) is an American former football fullback in the National Football League (NFL). He was drafted by the San Francisco 49ers in the 6th round (180th overall) in 1998 NFL Draft.

High school years
Beasley attended Robert E. Lee High School in Montgomery, Alabama and earned letters in football and track. In football, he was a two-time All-State honoree, won back-to-back state championships and as a senior, he was a USA Today All-USA selection and named an All-American by Parade. In track, he was a three-time State Champion on the decathlon.
His head coach was Legendary Hall of Famer Spence McCracken. His Home Economics teacher went out on maternity leave, so his full-time substitute was future State Champion basketball Coach Scott C. Davis.

College career
Beasley attended Auburn University, and was a star in football. He split time between fullback and tailback and finished his career with 1,241 rushing yards, 567 receiving yards, and 16 rushing touchdowns. In a 1997 game against the Georgia Bulldogs, a match widely considered the "Deep South's Oldest Rivalry," Beasley plowed over current Georgia Bulldogs head coach, Kirby Smart, who was attempting to tackle him.

Professional career
Beasley was selected by the San Francisco 49ers in the 1998 NFL Draft, and spent the next eight seasons with the franchise. At one time, Beasley was widely regarded as the best blocking fullback in the NFL. In 2002 and 2003, he was selected all-pro as a fullback. In 2003, he was named the NFC Pro Bowl team's starting fullback. Following his release from San Francisco following the 2005 season, he signed with the Miami Dolphins but was released early in the season. 

He signed with the Washington Redskins to a one-year contract. He was released on September 1, 2007.

NFL statistics
Rushing Stats 

Receiving Stats

References

External links

1974 births
Living people
American football running backs
Auburn Tigers football players
Players of American football from Montgomery, Alabama
San Francisco 49ers players
Miami Dolphins players
National Conference Pro Bowl players